Afzal Tauseef (May 18, 1936 – December 30, 2014), also spelled Afzal Tausif, was a Pakistani Punjabi language writer, columnist and journalist.

She criticized military dictatorship in Pakistan and was detained, later displaced several times by the rulers of that time such as Ayub Khan and Muhammad Zia-ul-Haq. Afzal has authored more than thirty books in Punjabi as well as in Urdu. In 2010, she was awarded Pride of Performance by the Government of Pakistan in recognition of her literary contributions. She was also associated with the Pakistan Peoples Party and served as vice president of Punjabi Adabi Board (PAB) for five years. Afzal also wrote a book titled Dekhi Teri Duniya (I have seen your world).

Early life
Afzal was born on May 18, 1936, in East Punjab at Simbli village of Hoshiarpur, British India. She was the only surviving child of her parents during the Partition of India, and then she migrated to Pakistan along with her father who was then posted as a police officer after the country was declared a sovereign state. Afzal initially stayed in Balochistan. She did her initial schooling, including matriculation from a government girls school at Quetta, and later moved to Punjab where she attended Oriental College but left midway. Afzal then attended Government College University, Lahore and did a master's degree in English. After completing higher education, she was then appointed as a teacher at the University of Home Economics (formerly a college). Later, she taught English at College of Education until her retirement.

Literary career
Afzal wrote books and editorial columns. She wrote for newspapers and published thirty books on themes such as politics, social issues, and art and languages.

Her books include:
 Punjab Ke'da Naa Punjab (what is Punjab) 
Tahli Mere Bachray (My kids, O Sheesham tree)
Panjjeevãn Ghanta (the 25th hour)
Vailay De Pichay Pichay (Following the past)
 Amman Vailay Millan Gay (we will meet in the time of peace) 
 Lahu BhijjiaN BatkhaaN (Blood-soaked Ducks)

Some of her books were later transliterated into Gurmukhi and published in India. She wrote a book on the fall of Bangladesh and Baloch cause, leading her to face military trials and detentions. My Beloved Trees, My Children was among the books she wrote about partition. Afzal's main subject was progressive writing.

Awards and recognition
During her lifetime, Afzal Tauseef received numerous awards for her literary works:
 Lifetime Achievement Award by Asian Writers Association, a Denmark-based nonprofit organization 
 Pakistani military dictators, including General Zia Ul-Haq, offered her the Pride of Performance award several times with a tract of farmland as a prize, but she refused until 2010, when she accepted the award.

Death and legacy
She died in Lahore on December 30, 2014, a day after being admitted to Alshafi Hospital. She is buried in Karim block cemetery in Iqbal Town. Her funeral was attended by Punjabi Adabi Board members and representatives of the Pakistan Academy of Letters including writers Kanwal Feroze, Parveen Malik, Baba Najmi and journalists.

A fellow Indian progressive writer, Amrita Pritam had compiled a book about her in Hindi entitled Doosre Aadam Ki Beti'' and also called her "Suchi Dhee Punjab Di" (True daughter of the Punjab).

References

1936 births
2014 deaths
20th-century Pakistani women writers
Indian emigrants to Pakistan
Government College University, Lahore alumni
Oriental College alumni
Journalists from Lahore
Women writers from Punjab, Pakistan
Punjabi-language writers
Pakistani columnists
Pakistani women columnists
Pakistani progressives
Recipients of the Pride of Performance